Jews' Cemetery Battery was an artillery battery in the British Overseas Territory of Gibraltar.

Description
At the start of the twentieth century this battery had a large 9.2 inch RML gun. This was one of 14 on the Rock. Its purpose was to engage shipping and to prevent a landing on Gibraltar. This gun was also placed on top of Gibraltar and these guns could hit the coast of North Africa.

References

Batteries in Gibraltar